The 1978–79 I liga was the 53rd season of the Polish Football Championship and the 45th season of the I liga, the top Polish professional league for association football clubs, since its establishment in 1927. The league was operated by the Polish Football Association (PZPN).

The champions were Ruch Chorzów, who won their 13th Polish title.

Competition modus
The season started on 27 July 1978 and concluded on 10 June 1979 (autumn-spring league). The season was played as a round-robin tournament. The team at the top of the standings won the league title. A total of 16 teams participated, 14 of which competed in the league during the 1977–78 season, while the remaining two were promoted from the 1977–78 II liga. Each team played a total of 30 matches, half at home and half away, two games against each other team. Teams received two points for a win and one point for a draw.

League table

Results

Top goalscorers

References

Bibliography

External links
 Poland – List of final tables at RSSSF 
 List of Polish football championships 
 History of the Polish League 
 List of Polish football championships 

Ekstraklasa seasons
1978–79 in Polish football
Pol